The dusky field rat (Rattus sordidus), also known as the canefield rat, is a species of rodent in the family Muridae. It is found in Australia, Indonesia, and Papua New Guinea. In Australia it is found in northern Queensland and along the east coast as far south as Shoalwater Bay, where it is plentiful, and on South West Island in the Sir Edward Pellew Group off the Northern Territory, where it is considered a threatened species.

References

Sources
 Baillie, J. 1996.  Rattus sordidus.  2006 IUCN Red List of Threatened Species.  Downloaded on 20 July 2007.
 

Rattus
Mammals of the Northern Territory
Mammals of New South Wales
Mammals of Queensland
Rodents of Australia
Mammals described in 1858
Taxonomy articles created by Polbot
Rodents of New Guinea